Cyw (Welsh for "Chick") is the name of a Welsh-language children's television block from S4C (Channel 4 Wales), which launched on 23 June 2008.

Primarily aimed at children in the 3 to 6 age group, Cyw operates from Monday to Friday from 6am to 12pm, and includes programmes which have been previously broadcast by S4C in the Planed Plant Bach (Little Children's Planet) slot, such as "Bla Bla Blewog (Ha Ha Hairies) Sam Tân (Fireman Sam) Tomos a'i Ffrindiau (Thomas and Friends) and Bob y Bildar (Bob the Builder) as well as shows being transmitted for the first time in Welsh such as Dafydd a Bitw ac Owain a Henri, Heini, Y Brodyr Coala (The Koala Brothers), Y Teulu Mawr (The Large Family), Rapsgaliwn, Dona Direidi, Caio (Caillou) and Ben a Mali a'i byd bach o hud (Ben & Holly's Little Kingdom).

Programmes

Current programmes
Ben Dant
Asra
(Welsh translation of Bing)
Dwylo'r Enfys
Hafod Haul
Jen a Jim a'r Cywiadur
Patrôl Pawennau (Welsh translation of PAW Patrol)
Octonots (Welsh translation of Octonauts)
Shwshaswyn
Cacamwnci
Dona Direidi
Rapsgaliwn
Llan-ar-goll-en
Cyw a’i Ffrindiau
Blociau Rhif (Welsh translation of Numberblocks)
Cywion Bach
(Welsh translation of Abadas)
Peppa (Welsh translation of Peppa Pig)
Sam Tân (Welsh translation of Fireman Sam)
(Welsh translation of Odo)
Y Brodyr Coala (Welsh translation of The Koala Brothers)
Anifeiliaid Bach y Byd
Timpo (Welsh translation of Tinpo)
Blero'n Mynd i Ocido (Welsh translation of Messy Goes to OKIDO)
Ahoi!

Upcoming programmes

Former programmes
Bob y Bildar (Welsh translation of Bob the Builder)
Dic a Dei a Delyth (Welsh translation of Dig & Dug with Daisy)
(Welsh translation of Boj)
(Welsh translation of Pingu)
(Welsh translation of Teletubbies)
(Welsh translation of Tweenies)
Meees
Tecwyn y Tractor (Welsh translation of Tec the Tractor)
Ben a Mali a'u Byd Bach O Hud (Welsh translation of Ben & Holly's Little Kingdom)
Y Dywysoges Fach (Welsh translation of Little Princess)
Bach a Mawr (Welsh translation of Big & Small)

Channel presentation

Idents and graphics
The channel logo was built of the word Cyw in the Elementary SF Sans font, the C being in red, the y in yellow and the w in blue. Cyw is a non-commercial block, in a different format as its parent, S4C.

Mascots
The channel features 6 characters, created as part of the channel's global identity, which are used as short animated bumpers into programmes.

The network mascots are a lion named Llew ("Lion"), an elephant named Plwmp ("Direct/Blunt" or "Plump"), a small fuchsia-coloured bird named Deryn ("Bird"), a giraffe named Jangl, a bulldog named Bolgi ("Glutton", and a play on the Welsh word for dog), and Cyw ("Chick"), a small female chick. A three legged dog named Triog would later join in 2018.

On October 4, 2018, Hoho Entertainment signed a co-production deal with S4C to create a localised version of Cyw's segments, titled Chickpea and Friends, with the Cyw character being renamed as then titular Chickpea. This series' VOD rights were later pre-sold to Canadian streaming site Kidoodle.TV in most countries and Tencent Video in China.

Cyw's characters were originally from Planed Plant Bach before it got replaced by Cyw.

Presenters
Presenters currently are Huw Owen, Cati Rhys, Griff Daniels and Elin Haf.

The future
In a press release, S4C announced that the plan would be eventually for Cyw to launch as a standalone channel. This was believed likely to occur during the switchover to DVB and DTT in the UK, which took place between 2007 and 2012. However, the launch never took place, and Cyw still remains as a block on S4C to this day.

Stwnsh has since replaced Planed Plant, providing two hours' worth of programmes, every weekday evening.

External links

References

Television programming blocks in Europe
British children's television series
S4C original programming
2008 British television series debuts